"Jamaica, Land We Love" is the national anthem of Jamaica, officially adopted in July 1962. It was chosen after a competition from September 1961 to 31 March 1962, in which the lyrics of the national anthem were selected by Jamaica's Houses of Parliament. When Jamaica was granted independence on 6 August 1962, "Jamaica, Land We Love" continued to be officially used as the national anthem.

History
Prior to the declaration of the independence of Jamaica, Jamaica was made a West Indies Federation province of the British West Indies, still under the rule of the United Kingdom. The nation entered the federation under the rule of Premier Norman Manley, who also made various constitutional amendments to allow the process of decolonisation to rapidly take place. These amendments also allowed the country to have more self-governing powers and permitted the formation of a cabinet led by a premier. Premier Norman Manley's participation in the West Indies Federation was unpopular and led to the independence of the country on 6 August 1962, and the national anthem selected in July 1962 was officially used from that date.

In September 1961, the leading People's National Party announced a competition to write the lyrics of Jamaica's future national anthem, which would be judged by selected members of Jamaica's Houses of Parliament. The competition received almost 100 script entries, and the competition closed on 31 March 1962, after this ending date was decided on 17 March. The Houses of Parliament were given two options of anthems to vote for on 19 July 1962, and a script was chosen with an overwhelming majority. The winning script was written by Reverend Hon. Hugh Sherlock,  the music was composed by Hon. Robert Lightbourne, and the anthem was arranged by Mapletoft Poulle and Christine Alison Poulle.

Lyrics

References

External links

 Jamaican National Anthem on Jamaican government site
 Richie Stephens performs Jamaica's National Anthem on SoundCloud

Jamaican songs
North American anthems
National symbols of Jamaica
National anthems
Songs about Jamaica
National anthem compositions in C major
1962 songs